Shakir Jammal Soto (born February 12, 1994) is an American football defensive tackle for the San Antonio Brahmas. He played college football for the University of Pittsburgh. After going undrafted in the 2017 NFL Draft, Soto signed as a free agent with the Denver Broncos. Over the course of four years in the NFL, Soto was signed to the Las Vegas Raiders, Dallas Cowboys and Seattle Seahawks.

Early life
Soto was born one of four children to Rhonda Vieney. He has two brothers and one sister. His uncle Terry Vieney played college football at Bloomsburg University.

High school career
While at G.A.R Memorial, Soto played as a defensive lineman and became a two-time All-State Class AA selection.

College career 
Soto enrolled at the University of Pittsburgh where he played in defensive lineman, defensive end and defensive tackle positions from 2013 to 2016. While at Pittsburgh, Soto was a communication major.

Professional career

Denver Broncos
On May 12, 2017, the Denver Broncos signed Soto to play as a defensive tackle. He was cut from the team four months later on September 3, 2017.

Las Vegas Raiders
On December 21, 2017, the Las Vegas Raiders added Soto to the practice squad. On January 2, 2018, the Las Vegas Raiders signed Soto to as part of its reserve roster. On September 1, 2018, Soto was waived and shortly after cut from the team the following day.

San Diego Fleet
Soto started 2019 with the San Diego Fleet of the Alliance of American Football (AAF). He made four sacks and 20 tackles in eight games.

Dallas Cowboys
On April 9, 2019, Soto was signed by the Dallas Cowboys. Soto was waived on August 31, 2019, before being cut from the team on September 1.

Seattle Seahawks
On December 24, 2019, the Seattle Seahawks added Soto to the practice squad. On May 5, 2020, Soto was cut from the team.

BC Lions
Soto was signed to the practice roster of the BC Lions in October .

New Orleans Breakers
Soto was selected with the eighth pick of the 24th round of the 2022 USFL Draft by the New Orleans Breakers.

St. Louis BattleHawks
The St. Louis BattleHawks selected Soto in the sixth round of the 2023 XFL Supplemental Draft on January 1, 2023.

References

Further reading
 

Living people
American football defensive tackles
American football defensive linemen
Pittsburgh Panthers football players
Dallas Cowboys players
Las Vegas Raiders players
Seattle Seahawks players
Denver Broncos players
New Orleans Breakers (2022) players
San Diego Fleet players
BC Lions players
1994 births
St. Louis BattleHawks players